California is a census-designated place and community in St. Mary's County, Maryland, United States. The population was 11,857 at the 2010 census, an increase of 27.4% from the 2000 census. California has been growing with the spread of population from the older adjacent community of Lexington Park and the growth in both technology-related and defense-related jobs at the Patuxent River Naval Air Station. There are department stores and numerous shopping centers situated along Maryland Highway 235 ("Three Notch Road"). Maryland Route 4 crosses Highway 235 in California, providing access to the wide Governor Thomas Johnson Bridge and the popular weekend resort town of Solomons on its opposite side. Bridge-bound traffic is notorious for backing up during rush hour.

History
The community was named after the state of California before 1897. The exact origins are unknown, however one story is that a family from the state moved to the area, using materials from their home state to build their new house, called the “California Farmstead.” Eventually, the name stuck.

Geography

Demographics

As of the census of 2010, there were 11,857 people residing in California in 4,327 households. There were 4,697 housing units and a 71.8% home ownership rate. The racial makeup was 70.7% White, 18.3% Black, 5.7% Hispanic or Latino, 4.6% Asian, 0.5% Indigenous American, and 0.1% Pacific Islander.

Of the 4,327 households, 42.7% had children under the age of 18 living in them, 57.2% had married couples, 9.9% had a female householder with no husband present, and 29.4% were non-families. 25.4% of all households were made up of individuals, and 4.1% had someone living alone who was 65 years of age or older. The average household size was 2.74 and the average family size was 3.31.

The population consisted of 29.8% under the age of 20, 6.6% from 20 to 24, 17.7% from 25 to 34, 17.3% from 35 to 44, 11.4% from 45 to 54, 10.5% from 55 to 64, and 6.5% who were 65 years of age or older. The median age was 32.5 years. The population was 49.1% male and 50.9% female.

The median household income was $85,240 and the median family income was $91,935. Male full-time year-round workers had a median income of $63,657 versus $44,390 for females. The per capita income for the CDP was $35,386. Just 0.8% of families and 3.1% of people were below the poverty line, including 2.3% of people under age 18 and 4.8% of those age 65 or over. In 2017, California, Maryland was listed as the metropolitan area with the fourth highest number of households with investable assets above one million dollars. In 2019, Forbes Magazine listed California, Maryland as one of the best small places for business and careers in the nation with a ranking of 69.

References

Census-designated places in St. Mary's County, Maryland
Census-designated places in Maryland
Maryland populated places on the Chesapeake Bay